The Harwich Mariners are a collegiate summer baseball team based in Harwich, Massachusetts. The team is a member of the Cape Cod Baseball League (CCBL) and plays in the league's East Division. The Mariners play their home games at Whitehouse Field in the historic village of Harwich Center. 

Harwich has won two CCBL championships in the 21st century, most recently in 2011 by defeating the Falmouth Commodores two games to none to win the best of three championship series. The title was the team's fourth in the CCBL's modern era and fifth overall. The team has been led since 2003 by field manager Steve Englert.

History

Pre-modern era

Early years
Organized baseball in the town of Harwich dates to the late 1800s. As early as 1873, the "Independent Base Ball Club" had been organized and was playing at the "Brooks Estate" in Harwich. The Harwich town club took on Sandwich in an 1884 contest, and played the "Yarmouth Grays" on multiple occasions in 1886. In 1903, the town's "Old Home Week" featured a three-game baseball series in which the Harwich team defeated Sandwich twice and Hyannis once. The home club was described as "the best that ever represented Harwich," and featured several collegiate players, as well as local hurler Dick Gage, who in 1905 was described as "by far the best pitcher on the Cape."

The early Cape League era (1923–1939)

In 1923, the Cape Cod Baseball League was formed and initially included four teams: Falmouth, Chatham, Osterville, and Hyannis. This early Cape League operated through the 1939 season and disbanded in 1940, due in large part to the difficulty of securing ongoing funding during the Great Depression.

Harwich originally entered the Cape League as part of a combined Chatham-Harwich team that competed in the league from 1927 to 1929. The team's home games were split between the two town fields. In the inaugural 1927 season, the team finished fourth in the five-team league, but nevertheless was described as "the hardest hitting team in the league." 1927 Chatham-Harwich first baseman Jack Burns went on to play in seven major league seasons for the St. Louis Browns and Detroit Tigers. In all three seasons from 1927 to 1929, the team featured Boston College batterymates pitcher Pete Herman and catcher George Colbert, as well as flashy infielder Artie Gore. The trio of Herman, Colbert and Gore later teamed up again with Barnstable to bring that club multiple Cape League championships in the 1930s. Gore went on to a major league umpiring career, working ten years in the National League, including two World Series assignments.

In 1930, the Chatham-Harwich team split and the two towns entered individual teams in the league, with Harwich playing its home games at Brooks Park. Throughout the 1930s as other teams struggled to stay in the league, Harwich was consistently among the best funded and best supported teams in the Cape League.

One of the first Harwich players to go on to the major leagues was Milton, Massachusetts native Bill Chamberlain. In 1932, Chamberlain was pitching for Harwich when he was noticed by a scout for the Chicago White Sox. Chamberlain was playing in Chicago by the end of the season. 

In 1933, Harwich won its first Cape League championship. The team starred all-league selection Frank Skaff of Villanova, an outfielder who "covers acres of territory, catches everything in sight," and was "the dread of all opposing pitchers", and who went on to play for the Brooklyn Dodgers two years later. The Cape League split its regular season in 1933, and held a playoff for the league title between the winners of the first and second halves of the season. Harwich, winners of the season's second half, faced first-half winners and back-to-back defending league champion Falmouth. Harwich took the first game of the best-of-five championship series with a 4–2 home win, then went on the road and dished out a 10–1 pummelling at Falmouth Heights. The series returned to Harwich for Game 3, where the home team sent ace hurler Al Blanche to the mound. Blanche, a Somerville, Massachusetts native who went on to play with the major league Boston Braves, outdueled Falmouth's Harold Poole, 3–1, to complete the three-game sweep and secure the title for Harwich.  

In 1937 and 1938, Harwich was led by player-manager Neil Mahoney, an all-Cape League selection at catcher who went on to be scouting director of the Boston Red Sox. Mahoney's 1937 Harwich team featured Holy Cross pitcher Art Kenney and former Chicago White Sox outfielder Bill Barrett. Barrett had played several productive seasons in the major leagues, and finished tops in the Cape League in 1937 with a .440 batting average, as his "potent bat of bygone glory still [carried] a mean threat." Kenney played in the following season for the major league Boston Bees (Braves). Mahoney's 1938 team narrowly missed bringing Harwich its second league title, finishing the season just one game behind pennant-winning Falmouth.

The Upper and Lower Cape League era (1946–1962)

After a hiatus during the years of World War II, the Cape League was reconstituted in 1946, with Harwich joining the Lower Cape Division. In the inaugural season of the revived league, Harwich defeated Barnstable in the playoffs for the Lower Cape title, but was shut down by Upper Cape champ Falmouth in the league championship series. The 1946 season also featured the league's first All-Star Game, held at Harwich's Brooks Park. The contest matched a team of CCBL all-stars against a team of Boston Red Sox tryout players chosen by scouts of the major league team.

In the 1949 and 1950 seasons, Harwich fielded two entries in the Cape League, as the Cape Verdean Club of Harwich joined the league's Lower Cape Division.

Harwich did not reach the league title series again until 1962 when the team was downed by Upper Cape powerhouse Cotuit after defeating Chatham for the Lower Cape title. Harwich's 1961 and 1962 teams featured CCBL Hall of Famer and longtime New Jersey Devils general manager Lou Lamoriello, who played in the CCBL until 1964, then skippered Sagamore to the league title in 1965.

Modern era (1963–present)

In 1963, the CCBL was reorganized and became officially sanctioned by the NCAA. The league would no longer be characterized by "town teams" who fielded mainly Cape Cod residents, but would now be a formal collegiate league. Teams began to recruit college players and coaches from an increasingly wide geographic radius. 

The league was originally composed of ten teams, which were divided into Upper Cape and Lower Cape divisions. Harwich joined Orleans, Chatham, Yarmouth and a team from Otis Air Force Base in the Lower Cape Division.

The 1960s and 1970s

The Harwich teams of the mid- and late-1960s featured several notable players. Harwich's native son and Boston College hurler Peter Ford spent four summers with the team, posting a combined ERA of 3.36 with 18 wins and two league all-star selections. Ford later served as a Cape League vice president, and was inducted into the CCBL Hall of Fame in 2010.

Harwich's 1966 team featured CCBL Hall of Famer Ed Drucker, who batted .382, set a league record with eight triples, and was named league MVP. The 1967 Harwich team featured Northbridge, Massachusetts native and future major leaguer Glenn Adams, a center fielder who slugged three triples in a single game for the Mariners, and blasted a homer in the CCBL All-Star Game at Eldredge Park.

In 1968, CCBL Hall of Fame manager John Carroll took the reins and led the Mariners to a 26–13 record, winning the Lower Cape Division in the team's final season at Brooks Park. The team included pitcher Bill Richardson, who went on to become the Governor of New Mexico and the United States Ambassador to the United Nations. In the 1968 title series, Harwich faced Upper Cape champ Falmouth, who prevailed three games to one in what was the first of Falmouth's four consecutive titles from 1968 to 1971. The following year the Mariners moved to their new home at Whitehouse Field. The CCBL held its 1969 All-Star Game at the new ballpark, the Lower Cape emerging with a 4–0 victory.

CCBL Hall of Famer Fred Ebbett took over the Mariners' managerial post in 1971 after over 20 highly successful seasons coaching baseball at Harwich High School. Ebbett skippered the team in 1971 and 1972, then again from 1975 to 1977. He went on to serve as CCBL Commissioner from 1984 to 1996, where he was a driving force behind the league's momentous transition to an all-wooden bat league in the mid-1980s.

The Mariners qualified for the playoffs in 1974 behind CCBL Outstanding Pitcher Award winner Andy Muhlstock, but were bested in the semi-final round by Orleans. Piloted by first-year manager Don Prohovich, Harwich advanced to the CCBL title series in 1978 and followed up that appearance with a return to the finals in 1979. In both title series, the Mariners were defeated by a dominant Hyannis team that had rolled through the two regular seasons with records of 31–11 and 33–7–1.

The 1980s bring a pair of league titles

In both 1981 and 1982, the Mariners boasted the league's Outstanding Pitcher Award winner: Greg Myers in 1981, and Scott Murray in 1982. The 1981 team featured Florida State University's Mike Yastrzemski, son of Baseball Hall of Famer and Boston Red Sox legend Carl Yastrzemski. Nearing the end of his major league playing career, the elder Yaz found himself with time on his hands that summer due to the 1981 Major League Baseball strike. As a result, he spent much of June and July in the Harwich Mariners' dugout keeping an eye on his son's progress. The 1982 Mariners featured CCBL Hall of Fame slugger Pat Pacillo, who walloped 10 homers on the season.

In 1983, Harwich finally broke through and claimed a CCBL title. Skippered by Steve Ring, the team returned the powerful Pacillo, who was good again for eight homers and a .338 batting average, and even went 1–0 with a 4.82 ERA as a pitcher. Rob Souza went 7–2 on the mound in the regular season, and led the league with a 2.45 ERA. The star of the team however was the league's Outstanding Pro Prospect Award winner, Cory Snyder. The CCBL Hall of Famer clouted an amazing league record 22 home runs with 50 RBI and 47 runs scored. He hit home runs in four consecutive at bats on July 7–8, and twice hit three home runs in a game. The Mariners finished the regular season in third place, but eliminated Hyannis two games to one in the playoff semi-finals to earn a berth in the best-of-five title series against top-seeded Cotuit.

In Game 1 of the 1983 championship series, the Mariners came out on the wrong end of a 1–0 pitchers' duel, won on an RBI single by Kettleer Will Clark. Games 2 and 3 were played as a doubleheader. In the front end of the twinbill, Harwich jumped all over the Kettleers with a seven-run second, including a grand slam by Jon Pequignot. Souza went the distance in a 16–6 Mariner rout at Lowell Park. The back end of the doubleheader was played at Whitehouse Field, where Harwich hurler Jeff Koenigsman stymied the Cotuit attack. The Mariners took it, 7–3, to go up two games to one. Games 4 and 5 were played the following day as another doubleheader. With their backs against the wall and trailing through much of Game 4 at home, the Kettleers staged a late-inning comeback to knot the series with an 8–7 win. The Game 5 finale at Harwich was an all-time classic. Cotuit got a three-run homer in the top of the first, and Harwich answered in the bottom of the frame with a Pacillo grand slam. Harwich starter Mike Ulian was hit hard for seven runs, and Souza, who had pitched a complete game the day before, came on and was effective in long relief. Mariner Doug Shields cranked a three-run homer in the seventh, and the score was tied at 7–7 going to the final frame. Cotuit's Greg Barrios launched a two-run dinger in the top of the ninth to put the Kettleers up, 9–7, and hope was waning for the Whitehouse faithful. The Mariners came down to their final out with nobody on in the bottom half of the inning, but Pacillo doubled, and Pequignot came through with a clutch homer to send the game to extra innings. Both teams threatened but did not score in the 10th. Robbie Smith came on in relief of Souza in the 11th and set down Cotuit in order. In the bottom of the 11th, Harwich's Jim Sasko drove in Pequignot from third for the series-winning RBI and Harwich's first Cape League championship in the modern era.

The 1984 Mariners finished the regular season atop the league with an impressive 27–15 record, due in large part to the contributions of four CCBL Hall of Famers. League Outstanding Pro Prospect Award winner Mike Loggins batted .343 with 13 homers and was MVP of the CCBL All-Star Game at Philadelphia's Veterans Stadium. Joe Magrane led the league with six wins and six complete games, posted a 2.46 ERA with 77 strikeouts in 80.1 innings, and pitched two shutout innings and was the winning pitcher in the CCBL All-Star Game. Fellow all-star pitcher Scott Kamieniecki went 4–1 for the Mariners with a 2.14 ERA and 54 strikeouts. Casey Close was a dual threat, batting .329 with six home runs while going 2–0 with a 3.19 ERA on the mound. Close returned to Harwich in 1985 and again enjoyed an all-star campaign with 11 home runs and 30 RBI. CCBL Hall of Famer Scott Hemond was league MVP for Harwich in 1986; the outfielder/catcher slugged six home runs and led the league with a .358 batting average. 

Harwich wore the league crown again in 1987 for the second time in five years. On the mound, team MVP Dan Kite posted six wins and four complete games with a 2.21 ERA, and future major league all-star Charles Nagy of the University of Connecticut and Andy Berg were CCBL all-stars in the Mariners' bullpen. The team also featured future major leaguers John Flaherty, University of Massachusetts infielder Gary Disarcina, and slugger Bob Hamelin, who led the league with 11 home runs. Led by manager Bill Springman, the Mariners finished the regular season with the league's best record, and met Cotuit in the playoff semi-finals. In Game 1, Harwich struck early at home with a three-run bomb by Steve Finken in a four-run first inning, and Kite went the distance on the hill, striking out 13 Kettleers en route to a 4–2 win. Finken hit a two-run dinger in Game 2 at Lowell Park, and teammate Tom Boyce added a pair of homers, but it wasn't enough as Cotuit prevailed, 9–8 in 10 innings. Cotuit's Troy Chacon allowed only two Mariners hits in Game 3 at Whitehouse Field, but one of them was a second-inning solo shot by Boyce. Harwich starter Nelson Arriete made the lone run stand up, going the distance in the 1–0 shutout to advance the Mariners to the title series against Y-D.

In Game 1 of the 1987 championship series at Whitehouse Field, the Red Sox chased Mariners starter Everett Cunningham from the mound in the fifth, and Nagy came on in relief trailing, 3–1. Boyce hit yet another clout in the seventh to narrow the margin, and Derek Lee proved the hero with a three-run go-ahead blast in the eighth. Nagy no-hit the Red Sox in 4 1/3 frames of relief, and the Mariners took the opener, 5–3. Kite went the distance for Harwich in Game 2 at Red Wilson Field, but scattered four runs and got little help from his bats in a 4–1 loss that knotted the series. Harwich got three runs in each of the first two innings of Game 3 on home turf, and Nagy came on in relief of starter Dave Menhart. For the second time in the series, Nagy no-hit the Red Sox over 4 1/3 innings of relief, and the Mariners came away with a 7–2 victory to secure the championship. Nagy, the playoff MVP, recorded the final out by way of strikeout against league MVP and batting champ Mickey Morandini, whom Nagy caught looking on a 3–2 count.

The 1990s

The Mariners qualified for postseason play only once in the 1990s, reaching the title series in 1997 under skipper Chad Holbrook, who had played in the Cape League in 1992 for Chatham. Holbrook's squad dropped the 1997 finals series to Wareham, a team that starred a familiar face: league MVP and CCBL Hall of Famer Carlos Peña, who had played for Harwich the previous season.

Notable players during the 1990s included Kevin Millar, a future Boston Red Sox fan favorite and member of the 2004 World Series team that ended the Red Sox' 86-year title drought. The Mariners also boasted the league's Outstanding Pitcher Award winner for three consecutive seasons with Eddie Yarnall (1995), Billy Coleman (1996) and Brent Hoard (1997). 

In 1998, a new scoreboard was installed at Whitehouse Field, a donation of former Major League Baseball Commissioner Fay Vincent, Jr. in memory of his father, Fay Vincent, Sr. The Commissioner had been a longtime summer resident of Harwich and a fan of the Mariners and the CCBL, and wished to honor his late father who had been the baseball captain at Yale University in 1931. The scoreboard was dedicated on July 6, 1998 as part of "Fay Vincent Night at Whitehouse Field", and was billed by the CCBL as being "the largest scoreboard in New England south of Fenway Park." The 1998 Mariners were skippered by CCBL Hall of Famer Billy Best, who had played for Falmouth in 1979 where he set a CCBL record with his 32-game hitting streak.

The 2000s and the end of a long drought

The 2004 Mariners featured CCBL Hall of Famer Craig Hansen, a hard-throwing closer who recorded a perfect 0.00 ERA with 41 strikeouts in 22.1 innings of work. Other notable players during the decade included the 2002 CCBL Outstanding Relief Pitcher Award winner Shaun Marcum, and future major league all-star and Cy Young Award winner Tim Lincecum of the 2005 Mariners. The 2003 Mariners battled Orleans at Eldredge Park in a 20-inning marathon that set the record as the longest game in modern-era CCBL history. Harwich pushed across the go-ahead run in the top of the 20th, and second baseman Tug Hulett took the mound and recorded the save for the Mariners in the 5 hour, 52 minute affair. The Mariners' playoff drought continued well into the 2000s, as the team reached the postseason only once during the 20-year span from 1988 to 2007. 

The Mariners' woes ended in 2008. The club featured future major league all-stars Brandon Belt and DJ LeMahieu, as well as one of the CCBL's top hitters, Tommy Medica, who batted .352 for the season. The Mariners opened the postseason with a two-game sweep of Orleans in the semi-finals, then faced Cotuit in the title series. After going on the road and pounding the Kettleers, 11–2, in Game 1, Harwich returned home for Game 2 with ideas of a sweep. Over 6,000 fans packed Whitehouse Field for the second game, but the series seemed headed back to Cotuit as the visitors took a 1–0 lead into the bottom of the ninth. A leadoff triple by Joe Sanders revived the Mariners' hopes, and with the bases loaded on a walk and hit batsman, skipper Steve Englert brought in pinch-hitter Mark Fleury. No stranger to late-inning heroics, Fleury had secured the East Division's 8–6 win in the CCBL All-Star Game with a two-run eighth-inning homer earlier in the season. Fleury rewarded Englert's confidence by coming through again, delivering Harwich's first league championship in 21 years with a 2-run walk-off poke to right-centerfield. For his clutch pinch-hit, Fleury was named playoff co-MVP with Jason Stidham, who had driven in seven runs for Harwich in Game 1 of the title series.

The 2010s: Englert's boys win another one

Throughout the 2010s, Harwich continued to be piloted by Steve Englert, the longest-tenured manager in team history. The club reached the playoffs in eight of ten years in the decade, finishing first in the East Division three times. 

Englert's 2011 squad was led by CCBL East Division All-Star Game starting pitcher Taylor Rogers, along with fellow all-stars Luke Voit at catcher, slugger Jabari Henry, and CCBL Hall of Fame reliever Chris Overman. As the playoffs began, the Mariners got a scare, with Brewster taking Game 1 of the first round series, but Harwich bounced back with an 8–2 Game 2 rout. The Mariners went down 2–0 early to the Whitecaps in Game 3, but scratched their way back behind 5.1 innings of scoreless relief by Eddie Butler, and Overman came on to get the final two outs to clinch the series with a 3–2 Harwich victory. In the East Division finals, the Mariners faced Y-D. After a Game 1 shutout of the Red Sox at home, Harwich sent Rogers to the mound with hopes of ending the series in Game 2 at Red Wilson Field. Rogers didn't disappoint, allowing only two Y-D hits through eight innings. Austin Nola homered for the Mariners, and Overman came in with runners on base in the ninth to close the door on the 4–2 Harwich victory to complete the series sweep.

In the 2011 title series, Harwich faced West Division champ Falmouth. The Mariners took Game 1 of the championship at home in a closely contested 5–4 game decided by first baseman John Wooten's go-ahead homer in the sixth. Wooten blasted another one in Game 2 at Falmouth, and the game went to the bottom of the ninth with Harwich leading, 7–5. With the title just three outs away, Englert brought in Overman to try to close out the Commodores in the final frame. Overman, who had not allowed an earned run in 28.1 innings during the season, proceeded to load the bases with no outs, but wiggled out of the jam by getting Falmouth's hot-hitting Reid Redman to pop out, then striking out the next batter, and finishing the job with a popout to the catcher to secure the Mariners' championship. Playoff MVP honors went to Mariner Mike Garza, who went 5-for-9 in the championship series.

Notable players during the 2010s included 2012 league MVP Phil Ervin, who batted .323 with 11 homers for the Mariners, CCBL Hall of Famer Ian Happ, a two-time CCBL all-star in 2013 and 2014, and 2016 league MVP Ernie Clement, a second baseman who hit .353 on the season. Harwich boasted the league's home run derby champs in 2012 and 2014 as JaCoby Jones and Sal Annunziata claimed the honors. Massachusetts native and multi-sport athlete Pat Connaughton pitched briefly for Harwich in 2013, and went on to a career in the National Basketball Association. Another multi-sport athlete, Kyler Murray of the University of Oklahoma, played for Harwich in 2017 and went on to win the Heisman Trophy in 2018. In a season highlighted by a regular season no-hitter by Jacob Palisch, and a playoff combined no-hitter against Chatham by hurlers Connor McCullough and Joe Boyle, the Mariners finished the 2019 regular season with only a .500 record, but cruised to the league championship series with playoff sweeps of Chatham and Y-D before being bounced in the finals by Cotuit.

The 2020s
The 2020 CCBL season was cancelled due to the coronavirus pandemic. The 2021 Mariners boasted the league's MVP as well as its Outstanding Pitcher as third baseman Brock Wilken and hurler Trey Dombroski took home the awards.

CCBL Hall of Fame inductees

The CCBL Hall of Fame and Museum is a history museum and hall of fame honoring past players, coaches, and others who have made outstanding contributions to the CCBL. Below are the inductees who spent all or part of their time in the Cape League with Harwich.

Notable alumni

Dustin Ackley 2008
Glenn Adams 1967
Andy Allanson 1982
Arshwin Asjes 2006
Alex Avila 2007
Mike Barlow 1969
Scott Barnes 2007
Bill Barrett 1937
Joey Bart 2017
Jason Bartlett 2000
Jim Beattie 1974
Jordan Beck 2021
Jalen Beeks 2013
Brandon Belt 2008
Cavan Biggio 2014–2015
Al Blanche 1933–1934
Skye Bolt 2014
Dewon Brazelton 1999
Mark Budzinski 1994
Aaron Bummer 2013
Danny Burawa 2010
Billy Burns 2011
Jack Burns 1927
Eddie Butler 2011
Daniel Cabrera 2019
Carter Capps 2011
Stephen Cardullo 2009
Keefe Cato 1978
John Cerutti 1980
Bill Chamberlain 1932
Ernie Clement 2016
Casey Close 1984–1985
Pat Connaughton 2013
Doug Corbett 1972
Jake Cousins 2015
Darron Cox 1987
Evan Crawford 2007
Xzavion Curry 2018
Gerry Davis 1978
Tony DeFrancesco 1982–1983
Gary DiSarcina 1987
Trey Dombroski 2021
Chris Dominguez 2007
Josh Donaldson 2006
Sean Doolittle 2005
Jason Dubois 1999
Taylor Dugas 2010
Joe Dunand 2016
Brad Eldred 2000
Phillip Ervin 2012
Danny Farquhar 2007
Cole Figueroa 2007
Derek Fisher 2013
John Flaherty 1987
Eric Fryer 2006
Herb Gallagher 1938
Jeff Gardner 1984
John Gast 2009
Kevin Gausman 2011
Dave Gavitt 
Jody Gerut 1996–1997
Johnny Giavotella 2006–2007
Mike Gillette 1987
Jake Goebbert 2009
Brian Goodwin 2010
Artie Gore 1927–1929
Reid Gorecki 2000
Phil Gosselin 2009
Oz Griebel 1970
Mark Guthrie 1986
Brandon Guyer 2006
Dave Haas 1986
Bob Hamelin 1987
Todd Haney 1985
Craig Hansen 2004
Ian Happ 2013–2014
J. A. Happ 2003
Jon Harris 2014
Scott Hemond 1986
Randy Hennis 1986
John Hicks 2010
Tommy Hinzo 1984
Rick Hirtensteiner 1988
J. J. Hoover 2008
Sam Howard 2013
Daniel Hudson 2007
Tug Hulett 2003
Todd Incantalupo 1996
Jonathan India 2016–2017
Ryan Jackson 1991
Eric Jagielo 2012
Kevin Jarvis 1989
Pierce Johnson 2010–2011
Eric Jokisch 2009
JaCoby Jones 2012
Scott Kamieniecki 1984
Art Kenney 1937
George Kirby 2018
Joe Klink 1982
Eric Knott 1994
George Kontos 2005
Marc Krauss 2008
Zach Kroenke 2004
Blake Lalli 2005
Lou Lamoriello 1961–1962
Mike Lansing 1988
Russ Laribee 1976
Derek Lee 1987
DJ LeMahieu 2008
Brent Lillibridge 2004
Tim Lincecum 2005
Corey Littrell 2012
Eric Ludwick 1992
Barry Lyons 1979, 1981
Joe Magrane 1984
Neil Mahoney 1937–1938
Mikie Mahtook 2010
Mitch Maier 2002
Trey Mancini 2012
Chris Manno 2008
Joe Mantiply 2011
Shaun Marcum 2002
Jake McCarthy 2017
Joe McCarthy 2014
Sam McConnell 1996
Marshall McDougall 1999
Aaron Meade 2009
Tommy Medica 2008
Adam Melhuse 1991
Matt Merullo 1984
Brian Meyer 1985
Levi Michael 2010
Kevin Millar 1992
David Miller 1993
Owen Miller 2017
Adam Morgan 2010
Hal Morris 1985
Taylor Motter 2010
Kevin Mulvey 2004–2005
Heath Murray 1993
Kyler Murray 2017
Charles Nagy 1987
Packy Naughton 2016
Jim Negrych 2005
John Nelson 1999
Sheldon Neuse 2015
Josh Newman 2002
Jeff Niemann 2002–2003
Aaron Nola 2012
Austin Nola 2010–2011
Rafael Novoa 1987–1988
Dick Offenhamer 1939
Kirt Ojala 1989
Adam Ottavino 2005
Pat Pacillo 1982–1983
Mike Pazik 1968–1969
Greg Peavey 2010
Carlos Peña 1996
Dillon Peters 2013
Tyler Pill 2010
Jared Poché 2014
Ross Powell 1988
Chris Pritchett 1990
Matt Quatraro 1994–1995
Dan Radison 1970
Cal Raleigh 2016
Matt Ramsey 2010
A. J. Reed 2012–2013
Mark Reynolds 2003
Bill Richardson 1968
Mike Robertson 1989–1990
Taylor Rogers 2011
Matt Ruebel 1989
Alex Sanchez 1986
Joe Saunders 2001
Tim Scannell 1989
Darryl Scott 1988
Chandler Shepherd 2013
Kelly Shoppach 2000
Jim Siwy 1979
Scott Sizemore 2005
Frank Skaff 1933
Eric Skoglund 2012
Josh Smith 2017
Pavin Smith 2016
Cory Snyder 1983
Peter Solomon 2016
Noah Song 2017
Paul Sorrento 1985
Adam Stern 2000
Mel Stottlemyre Jr. 1984
Todd Stottlemyre 1985
Chris Stratton 2011
Darnell Sweeney 2011
R. J. Swindle 2003
Dave Telgheder 1987
Clete Thomas 2004
Wyatt Toregas 2003
Bob Tufts 1975
Brian Turang 1988
Brant Ust 1997
Anthony Varvaro 2004
Cam Vieaux 2015
Matt Vierling 2017
Luke Voit 2011
Christian Walker 2011
Kevin Ward 1982
Tony Watson 2006
Zach Watson 2018
Terry Wells 1984
Antone Williamson 1992
Austin Wilson 2011–2012
J. T. Wise 2007
Ron Witmeyer 1986
Brandon Woodruff 2012
Mike Wright 2010
Ed Yarnall 1995
Mark Zagunis 2013
Josh Zeid 2007
Brad Ziegler 2002
Alan Zinter 1988

Yearly results

Results by season, 1927–1939

* During the CCBL's 1923–1939 era, postseason playoffs were a rarity. In most years, the regular season pennant winner was simply crowned as the league champion.However, there were four years in which the league split its regular season and crowned separate champions for the first (A) and second (B) halves. In two of thoseseasons (1936 and 1939), a single team won both halves and was declared overall champion. In the other two split seasons (1933 and 1935), a postseasonplayoff series was contested between the two half-season champions to determine the overall champion.† Played from 1927 to 1929 as combined "Chatham-Harwich" team

Results by season, 1946–1962

* Regular seasons split into first and second halves are designated as (A) and (B).

Results by season, 1963–present

League award winners

(*) - Indicates co-recipient

All-Star Game selections

Italics - Indicates All-Star Game Home Run Hitting Contest participant (1988 to present)

No-hit games

Managerial history

(*) - Season count excludes 2020 CCBL season cancelled due to coronavirus pandemic.

See also
 Harwich Mariners players

References

External links

Rosters

 2000
 2001
 2002
 2003
 2004
 2005
 2006
 2007
 2008
 2009
 2010
 2011
 2012
 2013
 2014
 2015
 2016
 2017
 2018
 2019
 2021
 2022

Other links
Harwich Mariners official site
CCBL Home Page

Cape Cod Baseball League teams
Amateur baseball teams in Massachusetts
Harwich, Massachusetts